Mishra is a surname found among Hindu Brahmin, in the northern, eastern, western and central parts of India and in Nepal.

Army personnel
 Avijit Misra – Colonel in Indian Army
 B. D. Mishra – former brigadier of the Indian Army, 19th Governor of Arunachal Pradesh

Doctors
 Anoop Misra – Endocrinologist
 B. K. Misra – Neurosurgeon
 Mohan Mishra – Physician

Entertainers
 Akhilendra Mishra – Indian film and television character actor.
 Amit Mishra (singer) – Indian singer and songwriter
 Leela Mishra – film actor
 Piyush Mishra –  Indian film actor, music director, lyricist, and writer
 Prachi Mishra – Femina Miss India Earth 2012
 Sanjay Mishra (actor) – Indian actor and comedian known from the show Office Office
 S. K. Misro – Telugu film and theatre personality
 Smriti Mishra –  Indian film actress famous for her roles in parallel cinema.
 Sudhir Mishra –  Indian film director and screenwriter
 Sugandha Mishra – Indian singer and television presenter
 Vanya Mishra – Femina Miss India 2012

Government officers
 Baidyanath Misra – former Vice-Chancellor of the Odisha University of Agriculture and Technology
 Brajesh Mishra (First National Security Advisor of India)
 Durga Shanker Mishra -Principal Secretary Ministry of housing and urban affairs, India
 Nripendra Misra – Principal Secretary to the Prime Minister of India
 Ramakant Mishra – IAS officer and renowned scholar
 Satyananda Mishra – National Security Advisor
Vikas Mishra (economist) – former Vice-Chancellor of Kurukshetra University

Judiciary
 Justice Arun Kumar Mishra -Supreme court of India
 Justice Dipak Misra – Former Chief Justice of India
 Justice Gyan Sudha Mishra – Judge of the Supreme Court of India
 Justice Ranganath Misra – Former Chief Justice of India, known for 'Mishra Commission'
 Kanhaiya Lal Misra – Advocate General (Uttar Pradesh)

Performing artists
 Baiju Bawra – Singer
 Bhubaneswari Mishra – Odia classical singer
 Birju Maharaj – Kathak dancer
 Chhannulal Mishra – Hindustani classical music singer
 Lalmani Misra – Indian classical musician
 Lisa Mishra – Indian singer and composer
 Rajan and Sajan Mishra – Contemporary North Indian Musician
 Sanjay Mishra (musician) – Indian born American guitarist and composer
 Shivnath Mishra – Indian sitarist and composer
 Pravisht Mishra - Indian actor from Prayagraj, Uttar Pradesh, India

Poets and scholars
 Bhawani Prasad Mishra – Poet (1913–1985)
 Godabarish Mishra – Poet
 Hara Prasad Misra – Scholar in oxidative free radical research
 Hemanta Mishra, Nepalese conservation biologist
 Jayamant Mishra – Jayamant Mishra, (1925–2010) Sanskrit scholar and Maithili poet
 Keshavdas – Sanskrit scholar
 Maṇḍana Miśra – 8th century Indian philosopher, Maṇḍana Miśra is best known as the author of the Brahmasiddhi
 Madan Mohan Mishra, Nepalese author
 Prabhat Mishra, Professor in the Department of Computer and Information Science and Engineering and a UF Research Foundation Professor at the University of Florida
 Rambhadracharya, Jagadguru Ramanandacharya Swami Rambhadracharya, Founder Tulsi Peeth and Founder Chancellor Jagadguru Rambhadracharya Handicapped University, Chitrakoot
 Srivatsanka Mishra – also called Koorathazhwar, Philosopher in Vishishtadvaita philosophy & disciple of Ramanujacharya
 Vācaspati Miśra, 10th century scholar, Author of TattvaBindu

Politicians
 Bhadrakali Mishra – Senior (Nepali) politician, Minister and Chairperson of King Bridendra's Privy Council
 Chaturanan Mishra – Former Indian Agriculture Minister
 Dwarka Prasad Mishra – Politician, former chief minister of Madhya Pradesh
Gajaraj Mishra, Nepalese politician and courtier allied to Prince Chautariya Bahadur Shah of Nepal and Vamsharaj Pande
 Hari Shankar Mishra – Nepali politician, former MP and Governor of Province No 2 (son of Ram Narayan Mishra)
 Jagannath Mishra – Politician, former chief minister of Bihar
 Janeshwar Mishra (Samajwadi Party Leader)
 Kalraj Mishra – Former Union Minister for MSME
 Lalit Narayan Mishra – Former Indian Rail Minister
 Narottam Mishra - Minister of Home Affairs in the Government of Madhya Pradesh
 Navendu Mishra – British Labour MP
 Nitish Mishra – JDU Leader Bihar and state Cabinet minister of Bihar
 Prem Chandra Mishra – Member of Legislative Council, Bihar, Indian National Congress politician and former Bihar NSUI Chief.
 Rabindra Mishra, Nepalese politician and former journalist
 Ram Naryan Mishra – Nepali politician, Minister in BP Koirala cabinet (brother of Bhadrakali Mishra)
 Satish Chandra Mishra (BSP Leader) Former Advocate General UP
 Shyam Nandan Prasad Mishra – Indian National Congress politician, eminent Parliamentarian and Central Minister
 Sripati Misra (Former Chief Minister of Uttar Pradesh)
 Surjya Kanta Mishra –  CPIM Leader, Leader of Opposition Bengal Assembly

Sportsperson
 Amit Mishra – Indian cricketer
 Mohnish Mishra – Indian cricketer
 Suresh Kumar Mishra – Former Indian volleyball team captain
 Tanmay Mishra – Kenyan cricketer
Abhimanyu Mishra - US Chess player of Indian origin holding the record of being the youngest Chess Grandmaster in the world.

Writers
 Govind Mishra – Indian novelist.
 Jaishree Misra – Indian essay-ist and novelist
 Pankaj Mishra – Indian essay-ist and novelist
 Pratap Narayan Mishra – Indian writer
 Yatindra Mishra - Indian poet

Other notable persons
 Anupam Mishra – Environmentalist & water conservationist
 Neelesh Misra – Journalist
 Vishal Misra – Indian-American scientist at Columbia University
 Rahul Mishra – Indian fashion designer
 Rakesh Mishra – Indian scientist specializing in genomics and epigenetics
 Sameer Mishra – 81st Scripps National Spelling Bee champion (USA)
 Sourav Mishra – Reuters journalist, one of the first witnesses of 2008 Mumbai Attacks
 Sudhir Kumar Mishra – Aerospace engineer, CEO of BrahMos Aerospace

References

Surnames
Indian surnames
Hindu surnames
Surnames of Indian origin
Brahmin communities
Surnames of Nepalese origin
Culture of Bihar
Bihari-language surnames
Surnames of Hindustani origin
Mithila
Culture of Mithila